Marcus Pode (born 27 March 1986) is a Swedish professional football who plays for IFK Klagshamn as a forward. He started playing football in Malmö FF and has also played for FC Nordsjælland and Örebro SK. He has been capped for the Swedish under 21 national team.

Career
Pode left Trelleborgs FF at the end of 2018, together with four other teammates. On 1 March 2019, he then joined IFK Klagshamn where his brother, Daniel Pode, where the manager.

References

External links
  
 
 

1986 births
Living people
Swedish footballers
Sweden under-21 international footballers
Sweden youth international footballers
Malmö FF players
Trelleborgs FF players
Örebro SK players
FC Nordsjælland players
Danish Superliga players
Allsvenskan players
Superettan players
Expatriate men's footballers in Denmark
Association football forwards
Mjällby AIF players
Footballers from Malmö